Henry Williams House may refer to:

Henry Williams House (Huntington, New York), listed on the National Register of Historic Places (NRHP)
Henry Harrison Williams House, Avon, Ohio, listed on the NRHP in Lorain County, Ohio

See also
Williams House (disambiguation)